Ubiquitin carboxyl-terminal hydrolase isozyme L3 is an enzyme that in humans is encoded by the UCHL3 gene.

Interactions
UCHL3 has been shown to interact with NEDD8 and the tauopathy and synucleinopathy associated mutated ubiquitin molecule UBB+1.

See also

 Ubiquitin carboxy-terminal hydrolase L1—an enzyme

References

Further reading